Gandhi Seva Sadan is a Kathakali institution located in Perur village, some 12 kilometres east of Ottapalam in Palakkad district of north-central Kerala in southern India. It was founded in 1953 by the (late) Gandhian and freedom fighter K. Kumaran, equally known for his unflagging devotion to the promotion of the arts.

Having celebrated its golden jubilee, Sadanam Kathakali and Classic Arts Academy is one of the four oldest schools providing training in the classical dance-drama of Kathakali in the traditional residential (gurukula) style. The most prominent among today's Kathakali exponents from Sadanam have all had tutelage under Padma Shri Keezhpadam Kumaran Nair.

Located in a green, silent locality on the banks of the river Bharatapuzha, Sadanam has groomed several artistes who have gained acclaim in the field as actor-dancers, musicians, percussionists, make-up men and greenroom assistants. Among them are Sadanam Krishnankutty, Sadanam P. V. Balakrishnan, Ramankutty, Narippatta Narayanan Namboodiri, Pariyanampatta Divakaran, Sadanam K. Harikumaran, Bhasi, Manikantan, Sreenathan, Rahul and Kiran (all actor-dancers), besides musicians like Sadanam Jyothi Radhakrishnan, Rajagopalan, Shyamalan and Sivadas; chenda artistes like Sadanam Vasu, Mattannur Sankarankutty Marar, Sadanam Divakaran, Gopalakrishnan, Ramakrishnan, Sivakumar and Sreekumar; maddalam artistes like Cherpulasseri Sivan, Sadanam Sreedharan, Ramachandran, Murukajyothi, Rajan, Devadas and Bharatharajan; make-up (chutti) artistes Sadanam Sreenivasan and Saju; and greenroom artistes Kunjan and Govindan.

Not far away from its main campus, the academy has an impressive indoor-cum-outdoor auditorium that plays the venue for Sadanam's functions during special occasions like anniversary celebrations and the Pattikkamthodi Jayanti (28 September).

Sadanam has been listed in the official tourism sites of the Department of Tourism, Government of Kerala, India. Details of the courses offered by the traditional Kathakali training centre can be accessed at http://trainingcentres.keralatourism.org/centre_details.php?id=19. Its contributions to the culture of Kerala and its history figure in performance videos that have been documented as a heritage in association with UNESCO. These videos can be accessed at http://www.indiavideo.org/kerala/heritage/performing-arts/kathakali/gandhi-seva-sadan-503.php. Its long-standing reputation and contributions to the traditional art form has also earned it recognition as an institution of higher learning by the Government of India.

Gandhi Seva Sadan also runs a teachers training institute, a senior secondary school (affiliated to the CBSE) and a computer training center under its management.

Life profile of founder K. Kumaran
Gandhi Seva Sadan was founded by Kollaikal Kumaran, son of Madathil Narayanan Nair and Kollaikal Devakiamma. He finished his schooling from the government high school in his native Thiruvilwamala and joined Government Victoria college, Palakkad, in the year 1941 for his intermediate.

While in college, Kumaran followed Mahatma Gandhi's call for fight against the British for India's independence and took part in Quit India Movement. Quite expectedly, he was expelled from the college for this action. He then joined the freedom struggle and was jailed in Alippuram, Bellary, for his activities against the "British Raj". Inspired by the Mahatma's call to "Do or Die", Kumaran managed to escape from Allipuram Jail in 1943. He was arrested in Madras, but he managed to escape again from police custody. His uncle Madathil Vasudevan Nair whom he lovingly called "Vasuetta" supported him.

During a second conviction in Bellary jail, Kumaran was subjected to torture and put in iron fetters under the order of Col. Howe. He was released in 1944. Soon after this, he went to Bombay (now Mumbai) as a full-time congress worker and captained the volunteer team for the 1945 AICC session. During this session, he came into contact with Gandhiji and several senior Congress leaders. Heeding to Mahatma Gandhi's call to youngsters to live and die in the villages of India, Kumaran set forth and put in the place the first modest steps for what was to become a big institution in his Perur. With the help of a small sum donated by few village elders he bought 12 charkhas (cotton-spinning machines which were at that time the symbol of the aspirations of an independent India). He established a school, a teacher training Institution,a Vocational centre, and a Kathakali Centre and Bharatanatyam Institute. Throughout his lifetime he wore Khadhi cloth and followed Gandhiji. He weathered difficult times, but eventually built Sadanam as a renowned institution. Kumaran died in 2005.

Gurus at Sadanam
Sadanam has a tradition of inviting the  greatest of gurus of Kathakali and Rasa Abhinaya as its trainers. The stalwarts of yesteryear include Guru Kunchu Kurup for Kathakali and  Kutiyattam maestro Natyacharya Mani Madhava Chakyar for Rasaabhinaya and Netraabhinaya (both Padma Shri awardees).

Sadanam has had several prominent exponents in its faculty, the longest-serving among them includes the late Keezhpadam Kumaran Nair. The students have earlier also had training under veteran gurus like the late Thekkinkattil Ramunni Nair, Padma Bhushan Kalamandalam Ramankutty Nair, the late Kalamandalam Padmanabhan Nair and Kottakkal Krishnankutty Nair, besides late masters like Kadathanattu Govindan Nambisan, Kalamandalam Neelakantan Nambisan, Kalamandalam Unnikrishna Kurup, Kalamandalam Krishnankutty Poduval, Kalamandalam Chandra Mannadiyar, Tirur Nambissan and Kalamandalam Appukutty Poduval.

Currently, Kumaran's son and versatile artiste Sadanam K. Harikumaran is the principal of Sadanam. Kathakali master Narippatta Narayanan Namboodiri is its director. Kalanilayam Balakrishnan, Paara Narayanan Namboodiri and Kalamandalam Satheesan are among the senior instructors.

References

See also
 Kathakali
 Classical Indian dance
 Arts of Kerala
 Mohiniyattam
 Kutiyattam
 Māni Mādhava Chākyār
 Nātyakalpadrumam
 Thulall
 Panchavadyam
 Kerala Kalamandalam
 Kerala Folklore Akademi
to find out kathakali events [kathakali news]

Kathakali
Schools in Palakkad district
Dance schools in India